The following list is composed of items, techniques and processes that were invented by or discovered by people from Switzerland.

Biology 

 Nucleic acid, DNA by Friedrich Miescher (1868)
 Restriction endonuclease by Werner Arber
 Research of the Immune system by Rolf M. Zinkernagel

Chemistry 
 Laudanum by Paracelsus
 Aluminium foil by Robert Victor Neher

 Cellophane by Jacques E. Brandenberger
 DDT by Paul Hermann Müller
 Lysergic acid diethylamide (LSD) by Albert Hofmann
 Reichstein process by Tadeus Reichstein
 Glyphosate by Henri Martin

Clothes and Fashion 
 Velcro by George de Mestral

Computing 
 Computer mouse by René Sommer, co-inventor
 Smaky by Jean-Daniel Nicoud
 programming language Pascal by Niklaus Wirth
 World Wide Web at CERN

Cuisine 

 Muesli by Maximilian Bircher-Benner
 White chocolate by Nestlé And his Partner
 Immersion blender by Roger Perrinjaquet
 Hazelnut chocolate by Charles-Amédée Kohler
 Conching by Rudolf Lindt
 Milk chocolate by Daniel Peter (disputed)
 Absinthe

Economics 
 Discovery of economic cycles and propagation of Social policy against the classic liberal economy by Simonde de Sismondi
 Bank secrecy

Medicine 
 Laudanum by Paracelsus
 Diclofenac (Voltaren) (1973, company Ciba-Geigy) 
 Panthenol (Bepanthen) (1944, company Roche)

Military 

 Swiss Army knife
 Full Metal Jacket bullet

Physics 
 Argand lamp by Aimé Argand
 Twisted nematic field effect by Hoffmann-La Roche
 Scanning tunneling microscope by Heinrich Rohrer (co-inventor with German Gerd Binnig)
 Super-twisted nematic display by Brown, Boveri & Cie
 Swatch Internet Time by Swatch
 Research on Nuclear Magnetic Resonance by Kurt Wüthrich

Sports 

 Bobsleigh
 Schwingen
 Hornussen

Technology
 Constant escapement by Girard-Perregaux
 Cross-beat escapement and remontoire for watches by Jost Bürgi
 LCD projector at Brown Boveri & Cie
 Riggenbach rack system by Niklaus Riggenbach
 Solar Impulse by Bertrand Piccard in co-operation with EPFL
 Tourbillon by Abraham-Louis Breguet
 Turbocharger by Alfred Büchi

Transportation 

 Bathyscaphe Trieste by Auguste Piccard
 Articulated locomotive by Anatole Mallet

Miscellaneous 

 The Red Cross by Henry Dunant

See also
List of Swiss inventors and discoverers

Notes

References 

 
Inventions and discoveries
Switzerland

This is a link that will really help you
[https://www.iamexpat.ch/lifestyle/lifestyle-news/10-swihttps://